The 1990–91 Argentine Primera División was the 100th season of top-flight professional football in Argentina. This season saw the introduction of the Apertura and Clausura system in Argentina. The season began on 20 August 1990 and ended on 30 June 1991.

Newell's Old Boys won the 1990 Apertura and Boca Juniors won the 1991 Clausura. Unlike following seasons, Apertura and Clausura titles were not officially recognised by the AFA so both teams had to play a two-legged final to crown a champion for the entire season. After a 1–1 tie on aggregate, Newell's Old Boys won the championship 3–1 by penalty shoot-out.

San Lorenzo won the Liguilla pre-Libertadores after beating Boca Juniors, therefore qualifying to the 1992 edition.

Competition format
The tournament for the 1990–91 season was composed of 20 teams. Each team played each other teams in a single round-robin tournament. The season was divided in two separate championships, called Apertura (Opening) and Clausura (Closing). The winning teams from each tournament played a two-legged final for the season championship and to earn one of the two berths allocated to Argentine clubs in the 1992 Copa Libertadores. The remaining berth was allocated via a direct elimination tournament between the top four (or five, depending on the outcome of the season final) teams from both Clausura and Apertura. Relegation occurred at the end of the Clausura stage, with the two teams with the worst three-year point average (Primera División competition only) being relegated to Primera B Nacional competition.

Apertura Tournament
The "Apertura" Tournament began on 20 August 1990 and finished on 22 December 1990. Newell's Old Boys won the tournament and would play the championship final against the winner from the Clausura Tournament. The match played between Boca Juniors and San Lorenzo was suspended following incidents in the stands during halftime that resulted in the death of a supporter. No points were awarded to both teams.

Clausura Tournament

Championship decider
The championship decider was played between Newell's Old Boys and Boca Juniors, champions from the Apertura and Clausura tournaments respectively. After finishing with a 1–1 global score, Newell's won the final on penalties. With this result, Newell's was granted one of two Argentine berths for the 1992 Copa Libertadores. Boca Juniors played in the qualifier to compete for the remaining berth.

First leg

Second leg

Copa Libertadores qualifier
The qualifier for the 1992 Copa Libertadores was played between 13 July and 11 August 1991. San Lorenzo won the final against Boca Juniors and earned the remaining berth for the tournament.

Relegation
At the end of the season Lanús and Chaco For Ever were relegated after finishing with the two worst points averages.

See also
1990–91 in Argentine football

References

Argentine Primera División seasons
pr
pr
1
A
A